David Gordon Gilmour (December 11, 1881 – September 27, 1932) was a Canadian amateur ice hockey player for the Ottawa Silver Seven in the pre-NHL years. He was a member of the Silver Seven era winning the Stanley Cup in 1903. His brothers Suddy Gilmour and Billy Gilmour also played for Ottawa at the same time. He later became a prominent Ottawa businessman in the lumber industry.

Career
As a youth, Gilmour played several sports. He played ice hockey for the junior Ottawa Aberdeens before joining the senior Ottawa Hockey Club in 1897. He did not become a regular player until several years later and even then, being a centre had to share ice time with Frank McGee.

Personal life
Born on December 11, 1881, in Ottawa, Gilmour was one of four sons of five children born to Mr. and Mrs. John Gilmour. The other children were Bill, Sutherland (Suddy), Ward and his sister Gilbert. Gilmour attended Ashbury College. The family business was lumber, and Gilmour owned a retail and wholesale lumber firm D.G. Gilmour and Company. His father was a partner in Gilmour and Highson Lumber. Gilmour married Roma King, daughter of Supreme Court justice George Edwin King. They had three children: daughters Hope and Vale and son John. Gilmour died of natural causes while on a hunting trip near Mullin's Lake north of Ottawa in Quebec.

Gilmour is buried at Beechwood Cemetery.

References

External links

 

1881 births
1932 deaths
Canadian ice hockey centres
Ice hockey people from Ontario
Ottawa Senators (original) players
Stanley Cup champions